Sébastien Duthier (born January 1981, in Limoges, France) was a Professional Football player. He played with Cannes in 2006 but he had no caps cause of disagreements with AS Cannes's coach.

External links 
  Official website

1981 births
Living people
French footballers
Clermont Foot players
AS Cannes players

Association football defenders